Jersey Avenue is a New Jersey Transit station on the Northeast Corridor Line in New Brunswick, New Jersey.  It is near Jersey Avenue, in an industrial area next to a New Jersey Transit rail yard.  Unlike all other stations on the Northeast Corridor Line, Jersey Avenue has low-level platforms (the rest are elevated), and, since there is no wheelchair ramp, it is the only station on the line that is not handicapped-accessible.  Jersey Avenue opened in October 1963 as part of an experimental park and ride program.

Jersey Avenue has a different layout than most New Jersey Transit stations.  While it has two platforms, one for trains heading south toward Trenton Transit Center and one for trains heading north toward New York Penn Station, the northbound platform is not positioned across the track from the southbound platform as would normally be the case for most New Jersey Transit stations (especially those along the Northeast Corridor, which have a wider gap between platforms due to an extra track in each direction used by Amtrak).  Instead, the northbound platform is set behind the southbound platform and the platforms are separated by a parking lot.  With this layout, northbound trains from Trenton cannot service Jersey Avenue and thus bypass the station en route to New York.  Some southbound trains do terminate at Jersey Avenue, using a siding that is also used by special northbound trains that originate at the station.

In April 2014 NJT approved a contract for a design for relocation and rebuilding the station platform to permit high-level boarding, along with pedestrian overpass, vertical circulation, improved parking, and bus connection areas, as well as improvements to 5 miles of the existing Delco freight line to make it a 130 kilometers per hour (80 miles per hour) main line track for passenger trains. As of 2015, additional design and engineering work to reconfigure the station was funded, but no construction date had been scheduled.

Services 
As of 2021, Park America manages the parking lot at Jersey Avenue. Parking costs $60/month or $180/quarter as of May 1, 2021. Daily parking is also available for $6/day. Spaces in private lots adjacent to the station are available for $75–$100 per month.

History 

The conception of the Jersey Avenue station dates back to July 16, 1963, when officials for the Pennsylvania Railroad and then-governor Richard J. Hughes broke ground on a new station and freight depot along the line by the Tri-State Transportation Committee. The new station was started as an 18-month experiment done by the committee to provide people with access from the railroad to their cars in a new park and ride. The new station, slated to open in October, was to be funded by grants from the state and federal governments, and was the inception for a new mass transit system. The station opened October 24, 1963.

Station layout
The station has two low-level side platforms, one of which serves southbound NJ Transit trains at all times. Northbound trains originate from the siding track on weekdays; other northbound NJ Transit trains originating south of this station do not stop here.  Some southbound NJ Transit trains terminate on the siding track. Amtrak's Northeast Corridor lines bypass the station via the inner tracks.

See also 
New Jersey Route 91
County Yard
Millstone Branch

References

External links 

NJ Transit Rail Operations stations
Buildings and structures in New Brunswick, New Jersey
Railway stations in the United States opened in 1963
Stations on the Northeast Corridor
Railway stations in Middlesex County, New Jersey
Former Pennsylvania Railroad stations